Peter Roach (born 19 May 1975) is an Australian former cricketer. He played 25 first-class cricket matches for Victoria between 1995 and 2005.

See also
 List of Victoria first-class cricketers

References

External links
 

1975 births
Living people
Australian cricketers
Victoria cricketers
Cricketers from Melbourne